Richard Yuricich (born December 1942) is a special visual effects artist. He is the brother of Matthew Yuricich, also a special effects artist. Yuricich is of Croatian descent. He has been nominated for an Academy Award three times.

Oscar Nominations

All 3 are in the category of  Best Visual Effects

50th Academy Awards-Nominated for Close Encounters of the Third Kind, nomination shared with Roy Arbogast, Gregory Jein, Douglas Trumbull and Matthew Yuricich. Lost to Star Wars.
52nd Academy Awards-Nominated for Star Trek: The Motion Picture, nomination shared with John Dykstra, Grant McCune, David K. Stewart, Robert Swarthe and Douglas Trumbull. Lost to Alien.
55th Academy Awards-Nominated for Blade Runner, nomination shared with David Dryer and Douglas Trumbull. Lost to E.T. the Extra-Terrestrial. .

Selected filmography

Non-Stop (2014)
The Book of Eli (2010)
Mission: Impossible 2 (2000)
Event Horizon (1997)
Bill & Ted's Bogus Journey (1991)
Blade Runner (1982)
Star Trek: The Motion Picture (1979)
Close Encounters of the Third Kind (1977)
2001: A Space Odyssey (1968)

References

External links

Special effects people
Living people
People from Lorain, Ohio
1942 births